My Gift is the first Christmas album and seventh studio album by American country music singer Carrie Underwood. It was released on September 25, 2020, through Capitol Records Nashville. Produced by Greg Wells, My Gift features guest appearances from John Legend and Underwood's oldest son Isaiah.

Background
Underwood first announced the album in June 2020. The tracklist was announced on August 27, 2020. Underwood had been wanting to make a full-length Christmas album for a long time, and decided it would be her next musical project after promoting her previous album, Cry Pretty. The album was produced and arranged by Greg Wells.

The album features eight traditional tracks and three originals, two of those co-written by Underwood. One of the traditional tracks, "The Little Drummer Boy", Underwood was going to record alone but kept thinking about her oldest son Isaiah and asked him if he would want to sing with her on it, which he said "yes." John Legend is featured on "Hallelujah" which he co-wrote with Toby Gad. The two recorded it separately via emails and Zoom. During an interview with Today's Country with Kelleigh Bannen, Underwood stated that the song came in late into the album process and she knew she had to make room for it. It was also her idea to make the song a duet.

In September, Underwood told MusicRow, "I went through like every single song and I went on my iTunes and just started listening to so many versions, and marked down notes to give him [Wells] an idea of what I was looking for. Celine Dion's version of "O Holy Night" is so beautiful and big and classic. That was one I referenced. On the flip side, I didn't think I would find a version I liked of "Joyful, Joyful, We Adore Thee," because so many are so march-y. I was like, "How can we get away from that?" And he had the idea of me singing a cappella. I tried it and it ended up being so unique and it had a certain feeling about it that made me really happy and that's why we put it first on the album."

David Garcia, who co-produced Underwood's 2018 album Cry Pretty, co-wrote the songs "Sweet Baby Jesus" and "Let There Be Peace" with Underwood and Brett James.

Promotion and Live Performances
Underwood appeared on the Today Show on September 24, 2020, to promote the album. As cross-promotion for the album, Underwood starred in and executive produced an original HBO Max holiday special, airing on December 3, 2020, entitled My Gift: A Christmas Special from Carrie Underwood. In November, Underwood released a bonus track to the album, "Favorite Time of Year", in partnership with Amazon Music. It reached number one on the Billboard Hot Christian Songs chart, becoming Underwood's second number one hit on that chart and also reached number 62 on the Billboard Hot 100 chart.

The official music video for "Hallelujah" was released on November 19. Underwood appeared in a Ring commercial, as cross-promotion for her song "Favorite Time of Year." On November 26, Underwood and Josh Groban were the featured artists for iHeartRadio's Holiday special. Underwood performed "Mary, Did You Know?", "Have Yourself a Merry Little Christmas", and "O Holy Night." On December 3, Underwood performed "O Holy Night" on The Tonight Show Starring Jimmy Fallon. On December 8, Underwood performed songs from the album for a Pandora Live event, hosted by Storme Warren. On December 18, Underwood performed "Mary, Did You Know?" on The Kelly Clarkson Show. On December 17, she performed "Have Yourself a Merry Little Christmas" on Late Night with Seth Meyers.

In July 2021, Music Row announced Underwood would be releasing a special edition of My Gift on the one-year anniversary of the album's original release. In November 2021, the My Gift Christmas special returned to stream on HBO MAX.

In November 2021, Underwood performed "Mary, Did You Know" during ABC's CMA Country Christmas special. Underwood performed "Favorite Time of Year" during NBC's Macy's Thanksgiving Day Parade. On Dec 1, 2021, Underwood performed two songs – "Let There Be Peace" and "Have Yourself a Merry Little Christmas" – for the Rockefeller Center Christmas Tree Lighting. On December 18, the Grand Ole Opry, in partnership with the USO, aired a holiday special for the military, including a performance by Underwood. She performed "Silent Night" for Opry Live: USO Holiday Special.

Singles
On August 28, 2020, the promotional track "Let There Be Peace" was released to YouTube ahead of the album. The song peaked at number 21 on the Billboard Hot Christian Songs chart.

"Hallelujah" was sent to Adult Contemporary radio on November 13, 2020, and it debuted at number 28 on Billboard's Adult Contemporary chart for the week ending November 20. The song peaked at number one on the Hot Christian Songs chart, number three on both Adult Contemporary chart and Hot Country Songs chart and at number 54 on the Billboard Hot 100.

Critical reception

My Gift received mixed to positive reviews from music critics.  Stephen Thomas Erlewine of AllMusic called the album a "stately, somber affair" partly due to the production from Greg Wells, writing that the album "proceeds at a steady pace, adorned with very few bells and whistles, and a sparse choice that helps highlight how Underwood chooses to sing primarily religious-themed material." Tom Cramer of The Eastern Echo gave a positive review, writing that it "will bring the listener the gift of contemplation: to contemplate what the true meaning of Christmas is, what’s really necessary to celebrate Christmas during a pandemic, and to contemplate what is going on in the world today", also praising the duet with John Legend, saying it  "would be spectacular if they ever get to perform this song together." Emily Simpson of Vinyl Chapters gave a positive review, calling the duet between Underwood and Legend a stand-out track, and writing, "In a decidedly non-traditional year, Carrie Underwood has kept one musical tradition going with this album. My Gift offers us moments of joy and unity, a little dose of Christmas cheer that everyone needs to hear."

Chuck Campbell of Knoxville News Sentinel gave a positive review of the album, awarding it 4 out of 5, calling it "reverential, poignant and heavily religious – calming music suitable for reflection and introspection", but was less favorable toward the duets with John Legend and Underwood's son, calling the former "disjointed and ultimately overcooked" and speculating that the latter will "sound adorable to many, but cloying to others." The Observer gave a positive review of the album, awarding it 3.5 out of 5, but highlighted the promotional single, "Let There Be Peace," calling it "the most soulful" of the album. Katie Columbus of The Arts Desk gave it 2 out of 5 stars, writing, "Listened to in full, My Gift is cloying and repetitive. Whilst reflective and meaningful for some, for others it'll be sorely lacking in festive fun."

Accolades
The album received two nominations and one win at the 2021 Billboard Music Awards.

Commercial performance
In the United States, My Gift sold 41,000 copies in its first week and accumulated 1,000 streaming equivalent units along with 1,000 track equivalent units, debuting at No. 8 on the Billboard 200 and number one on the Top Country Albums respectively. The album also debuted at number one on the Billboard Holiday Albums and Top Christian Albums charts, Underwood's first album to do so. The achievement made Underwood the first artist to place eight consecutive number one albums on the Top Country Albums chart, according to Billboard. It reached a new peak of number five on the Billboard 200 after moving 53,000 units on the week ending December 19, 2020. The album experienced its best sales on the week ending December 24, when it sold 57,000 copies. My Gift spent a seventh nonconsecutive week atop the tally on Billboard's Top Holiday Albums chart as it re-entered on issue dated October 9, 2021, after six weeks at No. 1 last season following its release on Sept. 25, 2020. The album was reissued on Sept. 24, 2021 with three bonus tracks.

Two of the album's tracks, "Favorite Time of Year" and "Hallelujah", topped the Billboard Hot Christian Songs chart. They respectively became Underwood's second and third songs to reach number one on this chart, following 2014's "Something in the Water."

My Gift was certified Gold by the RIAA on November 5, 2021.

Deluxe Edition
In July 2021, the deluxe edition of the album was announced with a release date of September 24, 2021. The special edition contains three new tracks, including the number one hit "Favorite Time of Year", which was previously an Amazon music exclusive.

Other charted songs
All the tracks from "My Gift", including the Amazon Music exclusive "Favorite Time of Year", appeared on the Billboard Hot Christian Songs chart. "Favorite Time of Year" spent two weeks at number one before being replaced by "Hallelujah" at the number one spot, making Underwood the first female artist and only the second artist to replace themselves at the top spot in the chart's 17-year history.
Additionally with "Silent Night" at number three, Underwood became the first artist to command the top three positions of the chart for multiple weeks (four consecutive weeks).

Three of the songs from the album appeared on the Billboard Hot 100 chart, led by "Hallelujah" at number 54, "Favorite Time of Year" at number 62 and "Silent Night" at number 94. The first two songs also peaked high on the Hot Country Songs chart, at numbers three and five respectively, for the week ending January 2, 2021.

Track listing

Personnel
Vocals
Isaiah Fisher – featured vocals (track 4)
Brett James – background vocals
John Legend – featured vocals (track 6)
Carrie Underwood – lead vocals
Nina Woodford – background vocals

Musicians
Steven Becknell – French horn
David Campbell – arranger
Heather Clark – flute
Andrew Duckles – viola
Donald Foster – clarinet
David Garcia – acoustic guitar
Steven Holtman – contrabass trombone 
David Kalmusky – electric guitar
Rong Huey Liu – oboe
Mac McAnally – acoustic guitar
Carolyn Riley – viola
David Stone – bass 
David Washburn – trumpet
Greg Wells – acoustic guitar, arranger, bass, drums, electric guitar, percussion

Production
Serban Ghenea – mastering
Joseph Lianes – photography 
Randy Merrill – mixing
Greg Wells – producer, engineer, programming

Charts

Weekly charts

Year-end charts

Certifications

Release history

References

2020 Christmas albums
Albums produced by Greg Wells
Capitol Records Christmas albums
Carrie Underwood albums
Christmas albums by American artists
Country Christmas albums